Poker Alice is a 1987 American romantic Western television film directed by Arthur Allan Seidelman, written by James Lee Barrett, and starring Elizabeth Taylor, Tom Skerritt and George Hamilton. The film was shot on location in Old Tucson, Arizona.

Plot
Alice Moffit, a professional gambler, comes to 1880s Arizona to attempt to beat anyone she can find at her favorite game, poker: that is why she is called 'Poker Alice'. Along the way, she wins a hand and also wins a brothel wherein the allure of sex and money are tempting. Interested in staying a gambler, she must find a way to leave being a madam and decide whether she will choose as her fiancé her cousin John or the local sheriff.

Cast 
 Elizabeth Taylor as Alice Moffit
 Tom Skerritt as Jeremy Collins
 George Hamilton as Cousin John Moffit 
 Richard Mulligan as Sears
 David Wayne as Amos
 Susan Tyrrell as Mad Mary
 Pat Corley as McCarthy
 Paul Drake as Baker
 Annabella Price as Miss Tuttwiler
 Mews Small as Baby Doe  
 Gary Bisig as Gilmore
 Liz Torres as Big Erma
 Gary Grubbs as Marshal
 John Bennett Perry  as Frank Hartwell

Production
The film is loosely based on the life of Poker Alice Ivers but is fictionalized to the point that even the character's last name was changed for the movie.

External links
 

1987 television films
1987 films
1987 Western (genre) films
1980s American films
1980s English-language films
1980s historical romance films
American historical romance films
American Western (genre) television films
CBS network films
Films about poker
Films about prostitution in the United States
Films directed by Arthur Allan Seidelman
Films scored by Billy Goldenberg
Films set in Pima County, Arizona
Films set in the 1880s
Films shot in Tucson, Arizona
Historical television films
Romance television films